Alocasia melo is a species of flowering plant in the family Araceae, native to Sabah state in Malaysia. It grows on ultramafic soils. In the houseplant trade it is often sold as "Alocasia rugosa" due to its highly rugose leaves. In fact, Alocasia rugosa is a synonym of Alocasia cucullata.

References

melo
House plants
Endemic flora of Borneo
Flora of Sabah
Plants described in 1997